The 2021–22 season was the 102nd season in the existence of Valencia CF and its 87th consecutive season in La Liga, the top flight of Spanish football. In addition to the domestic league, Valencia participated in this season's edition of the Copa del Rey, finishing as runners-up.

Players

La Liga squad information

Reserve squad information

Transfers

In

Note 1: Javier Jiménez moved back to Albacete after his loan ended on a permanent deal.

Note 2: Adrià Guerrero joined Zürich after returning to the club on a permanent deal.

Out

Note 1: Jorget Saenz's loan at Portuguese club Marítimo was cancelled mid-season before he moved to Mirandés.

Extension

Pre-season and friendlies

Competitions

Overall record

La Liga

League table

Results summary

Results by round

Matches
The league fixtures were announced on 30 June 2021.

Copa del Rey

Statistics

Appearances and goals
Last updated 21 May 2022

|-
! colspan=14 style=background:#dcdcdc; text-align:center|Goalkeepers

|-
! colspan=14 style=background:#dcdcdc; text-align:center|Defenders

|-
! colspan=14 style=background:#dcdcdc; text-align:center|Midfielders

|-
! colspan=14 style=background:#dcdcdc; text-align:center|Forwards

|-
! colspan=14 style=background:#dcdcdc; text-align:center| Players who have made an appearance or had a squad number this season but have been loaned out or transferred

|}

Goalscorers

Notes

References

External links

Valencia CF seasons
Valencia